William or Willie Ward may refer to:

Sports
 William Ward (American football) (1874–1936), American football coach at the University of Michigan in 1896
 William Ward (Australian cricketer) (1863–1948), Australian cricketer
 William Ward (cricketer, born 1787) (1787–1849), English cricketer, scorer of the first-ever double-century
 William Ward (cricketer, born 1874) (1874–1961), English cricketer
 William Ward (tennis) (born 1986), New Zealand tennis player
 Willie Ward (1909–1987), American baseball player
 Billy Ward (rugby league) (1888–?), rugby league footballer of the 1910s for Great Britain, England, and Leeds
 William Ward (1893–1968), American boxer who fought under the name Kid Norfolk

Military
 William Ward (Royal Navy officer) (1829–1900)
 William Ward (Texas soldier) (died 1836), American lieutenant-colonel during the Texas Revolution
 William E. Ward (born 1949), American general officer of the United States Army; inaugural combatant commander of United States Africa Command
 William F. Ward Jr. (1928–2018), United States Army general
 William H. Ward (1840–1927), American army officer and Medal of Honor recipient
 William Thomas Ward (1808–1878), American army general and congressman from Kentucky

Politics
 William Ward (1677–1720), Member of Parliament for Staffordshire, 1710–1713 and 1715–1720
 William Ward (mayor) (1807–1889), English Mayor of Oxford
 William Ward (MP for Morpeth) (fl. 1553–63), MP for Morpeth, and for Carlisle
 William Ward (Pennsylvania politician) (1837–1895), American politician, U.S. Representative from Pennsylvania
 William Ward (police officer) (1921–2006), Pittsburgh Police Chief in 1986
 William Ward, 2nd Earl of Dudley (1867–1932), British politician, Lord Lieutenant of Ireland and Governor-General of Australia
 William Ward, 3rd Earl of Dudley (1894–1969), British Conservative politician
 William Ward, 3rd Viscount Dudley and Ward (1750–1823), British peer and politician
 William Ward Jr. (1865–1949), American politician from Pennsylvania
 William D. Ward, American politician, member of the Florida House of Representatives
 William Dudley Ward (1877–1946), British Liberal politician and Olympic sailor
 William F. Ward (born 1951), American lawyer and politician (Pennsylvania)
 William John Ward (1880–1971), Canadian farmer and politician in Manitoba
 William L. Ward (1856–1933), American politician, US Representative from New York
 William T. Ward (Wisconsin legislator), member of the Wisconsin State Assembly for 1850
 William W. Ward (1903–?), American politician, member of the Wisconsin State Assembly

Religion
 William Ward (bishop) (1761–1838), Anglican clergyman and the Bishop of Sodor and Man
 William Ward (missionary) (1769–1823), British pioneer, Baptist missionary
 William Ward (priest) (c. 1560–1641), English Roman Catholic martyr
 William George Ward (1812–1882), English Roman Catholic theologian and mathematician
 William Hayes Ward (1835–1916), American clergyman, editor, and Orientalist
 William Humble Ward, 10th Baron Ward (1781–1835), clergyman

Other fields
 William Ward (astronomer) (1944–2018), American astronomer
 William Ward (engraver) (1766–1826), English engraver
 William Ward (frontiersman) (1752–1822), frontiersman, early settler of western Virginia, Kentucky and Ohio
 William Ward (goldsmith), English goldsmith and financier
 William Ward (Utah architect) (1827–1893), architect in Utah
 William Ward, 1st Earl of Dudley (1817–1885), British peer and benefactor
 William Ward, 4th Earl of Dudley (1920–2013), British peer
 William Ward, 10th Baron Dudley (1685–1740)
 William Arthur Ward (1921–1994), American motivational writer
 William Ayres Ward (1928–1996), American Egyptologist
 William Erskine Ward (1838–1916), British Indian Civil Service officer
 William Henry Ward, American inventor
 W. R. Ward (William Reginald Ward, 1925–2010), English historian

See also 
 Bill Ward (disambiguation)